This article lists the election results of the Social Democrats (Ireland).

2016 general election results
The party received 3% of first preference votes nationally with its three leaders re-elected on the first count in their respective constituencies.
 
 Denotes candidates elected

2020 general election results
The party received 2.9% of first preference votes nationally with its two leaders re-elected.
 
 Denotes candidates elected

References

Social Democrats